Black Patch is a 1957 American Western film directed by Allen H. Miner and starring George Montgomery.

Plot
In a New Mexico town, two former pals from the Civil War, Clay Morgan and Hank Danner, meet again; but Morgan is town marshal and Danner is a wanted bank robber. They both love Helen, Danner's wife.

Cast
 George Montgomery as Clay Morgan
 Diane Brewster as Helen Danner
 Tom Pittman as Flytrap 
 Leo Gordon as Hank Danner
 House Peters Jr. as Holman
 Jorge Treviño as Pedoline (as George Trevino)
 Lynn Cartwright as Kitty
 Peter Brocco as Harper
 Ted Jacques as Maxton
 Strother Martin as Petey 
 Gilman Rankin as Judge Parnell
 Ned Glass as Bar-Keep
 John O'Malley as Colonel 
 Stanley Adams as Drummer
 Sebastian Cabot Frenchy De'Vere

See also
 List of American films of 1957

External links
 
 

1957 films
American Western (genre) films
1957 Western (genre) films
Films scored by Jerry Goldsmith
1950s English-language films
1950s American films